PLEX or Plex may refer to:

Science
 Googolplex, a large number, which has given rise to "n-plex" notation in the names of large numbers
 Plasma exchange, the removal and return of (components of) blood plasma to blood circulation

Entertainment
 Plex, a robotic character on the children's television show Yo Gabba Gabba!
 Com Plex, a 2000 album by The Helio Sequence
 Pilot License Extension, an item in EVE Online that adds game time to an account

Technology
 IBM Plex, a corporate typeface family used by IBM.
 Plex Systems, a US software company, developer of Plex Online and Plex Manufacturing Cloud
 PLEX (programming language) in Ericsson telephone exchange switches
 Plex (software), media center software 
 Steinberg Plex, Virtual Studio Technology software
 Plex (Google), an abandoned initiative by Google Pay